

Description
Yuchi Naval Base is a naval base used by the People’s Liberation Army Navy (PLAN). According to a number of media reports and open source satellite observation (Google Earth) it is the home base of the first PLAN aircraft carrier Liaoning; along with a number of escort and support vessels.

The base is protected by several breakwaters and has deep draught access. There are four mooring piers of over 1000 metres in length and fifth measuring approximately 820 metres in length. The harbour area is divided into two main areas with the carrier battle group occupying the eastern part of the harbour.

Location
The base is located within the West Coast New Area south of the major urban area of Qingdao on the Yellow Sea, in Shandong Province. Open source satellite imagery (Google Earth) confirmed the base is extensive and underwent considerable expansion beginning in early 2012. The base is subordinate to the PLAN's North Sea Fleet.

Strategic importance

This base is one of the biggest bases operated by the PLAN and is home to one of its two operational aircraft carrier battle groups.

As the PLAN continues to develop its at sea capabilities the carrier battle group bases will be of strategic importance for China as a capability to project maritime power beyond the Yellow Sea.

References

Buildings and structures in Shandong
People's Liberation Army Navy bases
North Sea Fleet